Piruanycha pitilla is a species of beetle in the family Cerambycidae. It was described by Galileo and Martins in 2005. It is known from Costa Rica.

References

Hemilophini
Beetles described in 2005